Don Ellis Orchestra 'Live' at Monterey! is a live album by trumpeter Don Ellis recorded in 1966 at the Monterey Jazz Festival and released on the Pacific Jazz label.

Reception

Scott Yanow in his review for Allmusic stated, "One of the most exciting new jazz big bands of the period, Ellis' ensemble became notorious for its ability to play coherently in odd time signatures... Ellis enjoyed utilizing unusual combinations of instruments; the instrumentation on this date consists of five trumpets, three trombones, five saxes, piano, three bassists, two drummers and a percussionist... Highly recommended". The Penguin Guide to Jazz said "Ellis manages to combine intellectual stimulation and visceral impact".

Track listing 
All compositions by Don Ellis except as indicated
 Introduction by Jimmy Lyons - 1:18 Bonus track on CD reissue   
 "33 222 1 222" - 9:51   
 "Passacaglia and Fugue" (Hank Levy) - 6:13   
 "Crete Idea" - 6:14 Bonus track on CD reissue    
 "Concerto for Trumpet" - 11:48   
 "27/16" - 6:01 Bonus track on CD reissue    
 "Beat Me Daddy, 7 to the Bar" - 8:24 Bonus track on CD reissue    
 "New Nine" - 11:18  
Recorded at The Monterey Jazz Festival in Monterey, California on September 18, 1966 except for track 5 which was recorded at The Pacific Jazz Festival, Costa Mesa, CA on October 8, 1966. (The CD liner notes incorrectly give the date of the Pacific Jazz Festival performance as October 18.)

Personnel 
Don Ellis - trumpet, arranger
Alan Weight, Ed Warren, Glenn Stuart, Paul Lopez - trumpet
Dave Wells, Ron Meyers - trombone
Terry Woodson - bass trombone 
Ruben Leon - alto saxophone, soprano saxophone, flute
Tom Scott - alto saxophone, saxello, flute
Ira Shulman - tenor saxophone, alto saxophone, clarinet
Ron Starr - tenor saxophone, flute, clarinet
John Magruder - baritone saxophone, flute, clarinet, bass clarinet 
David MacKay - organ, piano 
Frank DeLaRosa, Chuck Domanico,  Ray Neapolitan - bass 
Alan Estes, Steve Bohannon - drums 
Chino Valdes - bongos, congas 
Hank Levy - arranger (track 3)

References 

Don Ellis live albums
1967 live albums
Pacific Jazz Records live albums